Nodozana bellicula is a moth of the subfamily Arctiinae. It was described by Schaus in 1905. It is found in French Guiana.

References

Lithosiini
Moths described in 1905